Clearwater 175 is an Indian reserve of the Fort McMurray First Nation in Alberta, located within the Regional Municipality of Wood Buffalo. It is 7 kilometers southeast of Fort McMurray.

References

Indian reserves in Alberta